The Ministry of Legal Affairs and Attorney General's Chambers ensures that proper legal services are provided to the Government of Guyana, as well as statutory services to the public. The Attorney General and Minister of Legal Affairs is the head of the chambers. The Permanent Secretary of the Ministry of Legal affairs handles administrative responsibilities for the departments within the Ministry and is the Accounting Officer. The Advice and Litigation Division and the Drafting Division of the Attorney General's Chambers are headed by the Attorney General and Chief Parliamentary Counsel respectively.

List of attorneys general 
British Guiana 
 Sir William Arrindell (1845–1852)  
 Robert R. Craig (1852–?1855) 
 Sir John Lucie Smith (1855–1863)
 Joseph Trounsell Gilbert (1863->1871) 
 William Frederick Haynes Smith (1874–1888)
 John Worrell Carrington (1889–1896)  
 Henry Alleyn Bovell (1896–1902)  
 Sir Joseph John Nunan (<1924–1925) 
 Hector A. Joseph (1925–1936) 
 Sir John Harry Barclay Nihill (1936–1938)
 Edward Owen Pretheroe (1939–1946)
 Frank William Holder (–1955) 
 Sir William Campbell Wylie (1955–1956)
 Sir Fenton Harcourt Wilworth Ramsahoye (1961-1964)

Guyana - Post-independence in 1966 
 Shridath Ramphal (1965-1972) [served as the Minister of Justice from 1973-1978]
 Mohamed Shahabuddeen (1973-1987) [also the Minister of Justice from 1978-1987]
 Keith Massiah (1988-1992) [also referred to as the Minister of Legal Affairs]
 Bernard de Santos (1993-1997) [also referred to as the Minister of Legal Affairs]
 Charles Ramson (1998-2002) [also referred to as the Minister of Legal Affairs]
 Doodnauth Singh (2002-2009) [also referred to as the Minister of Legal Affairs]
 Charles Ramson (2009-2011) [also referred to as the Minister of Legal Affairs]
 Mohabir Anil Nandlall (2011-2014) [also referred to as the Minister of Legal Affairs]
 Basil Williams (2015-2020) [also referred to as the Minister of Legal Affairs]
 Mohabir Anil Nandlall (2020-Present) [also referred to as the Minister of Legal Affairs]

See also 

 Justice ministry
 Politics of Guyana

References 

Attorneys General of Guyana